The following is a list of works by Clark Ashton Smith.


Short fiction

Prose poems

Novel
 The Black Diamonds, written in 1907, published in 2002

Plays
 The Dead will Cuckold You: A Drama in Six Acts (in verse). Written in 1951.  First published in 1989. 
 The Fugitives: a fragment.  Written on September 17, 1922.  Published in 1989. 
 Venus And The Priest: a fragment. Published in 1989.

Lyrics
 The Dream Bridge: Music by Henry Cowell, words by Clark Ashton Smith. Written c. 1920. 
 Impression: Music by Joseph W. Grant, words by Clark Ashton Smith. 
 White Death: Music by Henry Cowell, words by Clark Ashton Smith. Written in Sept 1915.

Poetry
Poems (including translations) by Clark Ashton Smith:

Abandoned Plum-Orchard (1958)
Abel et Caïn (CXLIV. Abel et Caïn)
The Absence of the Muse (Oct 1921)
The Abyss Triumphant (3 Aug 1912)
Adjuration (1976)
Adventure (14 Feb 1924)
The Adviser (XCI. L’Avertisseur)
After Armageddon (1927)
Aftermath of Mining Days (1971)
Afterwards (16 Aug 1923)
The Albatross (II. L’Albatros)
Alchemy of Sorrow (LXXXII. Alchimie de la douleur) (1925)
Alexandrines (1918)
Alexandrins
Alienage (5 Jul 1923)
"All is Dross that is not Helena" (1971)
Allégorie (CXXXIX. Allégorie)
Almost Anything (1958)
Alphonse Louis Marie de Lamartine (Alphonse Louis Marie de Lamartine)
Las Alquerjas Perdidas (1964)
Alternative (1958)
Amado Nervo (Amado Nervo)
Amithaine (21 Oct 1950)
Amor (1962)
Amor Aeternalis (1961)
Amor Autumnalis (1977)
Amor Hesternalis (1962)
The Ancient Quest (1975)
Anodyne of Autumn (1971)
Antepast (1922)
Anterior Life (XII. La Vie Antérieure) (1948)
Anteros (1958)
Antony and Cleopatra (Antoine et Cléopâtre)
Apologia (16 Oct 1924)
Apostrophe (1971)
Arabesque (1922)
Ariettes Oubliées IX (Ariettes Oubliées IX) (1971)
Artemis (1922)
Artemis (Artémis)
Ashes of Sunset (1922)
At Sunrise (1922)
Atlantis (1912)
Attar of the Past (1958)
Au Bord du Léthé (1971)
August (1923)
The Autumn Lake (1971)
Autumn Orchards (15 Nov 1923)
Autumnal (1922)
Autumn's Pall
Ave Atque Vale (1918)
Averoigne (1951)
Averoigne (manuscript)
Averted Malefice (1912)
Avowal (1971)
Bacchante (1939)
The Balance (1912)
The Balcony (1925)
The Balcony (XXXVII. Le Balcon)
The Barrel of Hate (LXXV. Le Tonneau de la haine)
The Barrier (13 Sep 1923)
Basin in Boulder (1971)
The Beacons (VI. Les Phares)
Beatrice (CXL. La Béatrice) (1971)
Le Beau Navire (LIII. Le Beau Navire)
Beauty (XVIII. La Beauté) (1 Mar 1925)
Beauty Implacable (1922)
Bed of Mint (1971)
Bedouin Song
Before Dawn (1962)
Before Sunrise
Belated Love (1918)
Benares
Bénédiction (I. Bénédiction)
Berries of the Deadly Nightshade (1971)
Beyond the Door (1975)
Beyond the Great Wall (21 Dec 1919)
Les Bijoux (I. Les Bijoux)
Bird of Long Ago (1971)
The Black Panther (La Panthère noire)
The Blind (CXVI. Les Aveugles)
The Blindness of Orion (1948)
Bond (1962)
La Bonne Chanson (La Bonne Chanson)
Borderland (1971)
Boys Rob A Yellow-Hammer's Nest (1971)
Boys Telling Bawdy Tales (1971)
Brumal (1 Nov 1923)
Builder of Deserted Hearth (1971)
The Burden of the Suns (1977)
The Burning-Ghauts At Benares (1975)
But Grant, O Venus (1971)
The Butterfly (1912)
By the River (20 Sep 1923)
Calendar (1971)
Calenture (1951)
The Call of the Wind (1970)
Le Calumet de Paix (LXXXV. Le Calumet de paix)
Cambion (1951)
Canticle (1971)
The Castle of Dreams (1975)
The Cat (XXXV. Le Chat)
A Catch (2 Oct 1924)
The Cats (LXVIII. Les Chats)
Cats in Winter Sunlight (1958)
Cattle Salute the Psychopomp (1971)
Causerie (7 May 1925)
Causerie (LVI. Causerie)
The Centaur (1958)
Chainless Captive (1971)
Chance (14 Jun 1923)
Change (12 Jul 1923)
Chanson d'après-midi (LIX. Chanson d’après-midi)
Chansonette (1971)
Chant of Autumn (1922)
Chant to Sirius (1912)
Une Charogne (XXX. Une Charogne)
Chastisement of Pride (XVII. Châtiment de l’orgueil)
Le Chat (LII. Le Chat)
The Cherry-Snows (1912)
The Chevelure (XXIV. La Chevelure)
The Chimera (1971)
A Chinese Fable
The City in the Desert (1922)
The City of Destruction (A Fragment) (1989)
The City of the Titans (1915)
Classic Epigram (1971)
Classic Reminiscence (1971)
Cleopatra (1922)
La Cloche fêlée (LXXVI. La Cloche fêlée)
The Clock (CVII. L’Horloge)
The Cloud-Islands (1912)
Cloudland (1970)
The Clouds
Coldness (1922)
Companionship
Concupiscence (1971)
Confession (XLVI. Confession)
Connaissance (26 Jan 1929)
Consolation (1925)
Contemplation (CIV. Receuillement)
Contradiction (17 May 1923)
Copan (1912)
Copyist (1971)
The Coral Reef (Le Récif de corail)
Correspondences (IV. Correspondances)
Le Coucher du Soleil Romantique (C. Le Coucher du Soleil Romantique) (May 1926)
The Cover (LXXXVII. Le Couvercle)
Crepuscule (1922)
Le Crépuscule du matin (CXXVII. Le Crépuscule du matin)
Crimen Amoris (Crimen Amoris) (1971)
Crows in Spring (1971)
The Crucifixion of Eros (1918)
Cumuli (1971)
Cycles (4 Jun 1961)
Cyclopean Fear
Le Cygne (CXIII. Le Cygne)
The Cypress (El ciprés) (1951)
The Dance of Death (CXXI. Danse macabre)
Dancer (1971)
The Dark Chateau (1951)
A Dead City (1912)
Dead Love (1973)
Death (1970)
The Death of Lovers (CXLVI. La Mort des Amants) (30 Jul 1925)
Decadence (1971)
December (6 Dec 1923)
Declining Moon (1971)
Dedication | to Carol
Demogorgon
The Denial of St Peter (XLIII. Le Reniement de Saint Pierre)
The Departed City
Departure (29 Nov 1923)
Desert Dweller (13 Aug 1937)
Desire of Vastness (1922)
Desolation (1922)
Destruction (CXXXIV. La Destruction)
Dialogue (1943)
Didus ineptus (1958)
Disillusionment (1958)
Dissidence (29 Nov 1923)
Dissonance (15 Sep 1919)
Do You Forget, Enchantress? (1950)
La Dogaresse (La Dogaresse)
Dolor of Dreams (30 Aug 1923)
Dominion (1971)
Dominium in Excelsis (1951)
Don Juan aux Enfers (XV. Don Juan aux enfers)
Don Juan Sings (10 May 1923)
Don Quixote on Market Street (1951)
¿Donde Duermes, Eldorado? (1964)
The Doom of America
Dos Mitos Y Una Fabula (1964)
Doubtful Skies (LI. Ciel Brouillé) (1925)
The Dragon-Fly (1971)
Dream Mystery (1915)
A Dream of Beauty (12 Aug 1911)
A Dream of Oblivion (1975)
A Dream of the Abyss (Nov 1933)
The Dream-Bridge (1912)
The Dream-God's Realm (1975)
Duality (Aug 1923)
The Duel (XXXVI. Duellum)
Ecclesiastes (L’Ecclésiaste) (1956)
Echo of Memnon (1922)
Ecstasy (1922)
Eidolon (1922)
El Cantar Del Los Seres Libres (1964)
The Eldritch Dark (1912)
Elevation (III. Elévation)
Elysian Landscape (Paysage Elyséen) (1971)
En Sourdine (En Sourdine) (1971)
Enchanted Mirrors (1925)
The End of Autumn (29 Nov 1923)
The End of Supper
Enigma (1925)
Ennui (Thou) (Sep 1918)
The Ennuye (15 Jan 1925)
The Envoys (7 Jan 1926)
Epigraph for a Condemned Book (CXXXIII. Epigraphe pour un livre condamné)
Epitaph for An Astronomer (1971)
Epitaph for the Earth
Erato (1971)
Eros of Ebony (1951)
Estrangement (25 Sep 1924)
The Eternal Snows (1970)
Even in Slumber (1971)
Evening Harmony (XLVIII. L’Harmonie du Soir) (1925)
Evening Twilight (CXIX. Le Crépuscule du soir)
The Evil Monk (IX. Le Mauvais Moine) (10 Dec 1925)
Examination at Midnight (LXXXIX. L’Examen de minuit) (1925)
Exchange (7 Jun 1923)
The Exhibitionists (Les Montreurs)
The Exile (1922)
Exorcism (17 Jan 1929)
Exotic Memory (1971)
Exotic Perfume (XXIII. Parfum Exotique) (1925)
Exotique (1918)
The Eyes of Bertha (XCVI. Les Yeux de Berthe)
A Fable (1971)
Fairy-Lanterns (1912)
Fallen Grape-Leaf (1971)
The Fanes of Dawn (1976)
Fantaisie d'antan (Dec 1929)
Une Fantôme (XXXIX. Un Fantôme)
Farewell to Eros (Jun 1938)
The Faun (Le Faune) (1971)
Fawn-Lilies (1973)
Feast of St. Anthony (1958)
February (1971)
Felo-de-se of the Parasite (1971)
Femmes damnées (CXXXVI. Femmes Damnées)
Femmes damnées: Delphine et Hippolyte (V. Femmes damnées: Delphine et Hippolyte)
Fence And Wall (1958)
Field Behind the Abattoir (1971)
La Fin de la journée (CXLIX. La Fin de la journée)
Finis (1912)
Fire of Snow (Jul 1915)
Le Flacon (XLIX. Le Flacon)
Le Flambeau Vivant (XLIV. Le Flambeau Vivant)
Flamingoes (Nov 1919)
The Flight of Azrael (1952)
Flight of the Yellow-Hammer (1971)
Flora (1971)
The Flower-Pot (Le Pot de fleurs)
Foggy Night (1971)
For An Antique Lyre (1962)
For the Dance of Death (1971)
Forgetfulness (Jun 1919)
Forgotten Sorrow (2 Aug 1923)
La Forteresse (1971)
The Fountain (XCVII. Le Jet d’eau)
The Fountain of Blood (CXXXVIII. La Fontaine de san) (1925)
Fragment (1949)
A Fragment (1922)
Franciscæ meæ laudes (LXII. Franciscæ meæ laudes)
From Arcady (1971)
From the Persian
The Fugitives (1912)
The Funeral Urn (23 Aug 1923)
Future Meeting (1971)
Future Pastoral (1962)
The Game (CXX. Le Jeu)
The Garden of Dreams (1973)
Garden of Priapus (1971)
Geese in the Spring Night (1958)
The Ghost of theseus (1971)
The Ghoul And the Seraph (1922)
The Giantess (XX. La Géante) (1925)
Girl of Six (1971)
Give Me Your Lips
Goats And Manzanita-Boughs (1971)
Golden Verses (Vers dorés)
Gopher-Hole in Orchard (1971)
Le Goût du néant (LXXXII. Le Goût du néant)
Grammar-School Vixen (1971)
Une Gravure fantastique (LXXIII. Une Gravure Fantastique)
Grecian Yesterday (1971)
Green (Green)
Growth of Lichen (1958)
Le Guignon (XI. Le Guignon)
The Gulf (CII. Le Gouffre)
H.P.L. (1959)
The Harbor of Dead Years
The Harbour of the Past (1977)
The Harlot of the World (27 Mar 1915)
Harmony (1976)
Harvest Evening (1958)
The Hashish Eater -or- the Apocalypse of Evil (20 Feb 1920)
Haunting (1922)
Hearth on Old Cabin-Site (1971)
Heliogabalus (1971)
Hellenic Sequel (1951)
The Heron (1971)
Hesperian Fall (1951)
The Hidden Paradise (1922)
High Mountain Juniper (1971)
High Surf (1951)
High Surf : Monterey Bay (1976)
The Hill of Dionysus (5 Nov 1942)
The Hill-Top (1971)
The Hope of the infinite (1922)
The Horizon
The Horologe (1963)
The Howlers (Les Hurleurs)
Humors of Love (1962)
A Hunter Meets the Martichoras (1958)
Hymn (XCIV. Hymne)
Hymn to Beauty (XXII. Hymne à la Beauté) (1925)
I Dream
The Ideal (XVIII. L’Idéal) (1925)
If Winter Remain (1971)
Il Bacio (Il Bacio)
Illumination (1962)
Illusion
Image (1922)
Imagination
Immortelle (18 Dec 1924)
The Impassible (L’Impassible)
Impression (1922)
Improbable Dream (1971)
In Alexandria (1971)
In Lemuria (Aug 1921)
In November (Dec 1919)
In Saturn (Feb 1919)
In Slumber (Aug 1934)
In the Desert (1971)
In the Ultimate Valleys (1970)
In the Wind (Jul 1915)
In Thessaly (24 May 1935)
Incognita (1925)
The Incubus of Time (1963)
Indian Acorn-Mortar (1971)
Indian Summer (1971)
Ineffability (1971)
Inferno (24 Apr 1918)
The Infinite Quest (1922)
Inheritance (1922)
Interim (13 Nov 1941)
Interrogation (1925)
Invocation (Rimas LII)
The Irremediable (CVI. L’Irrémédiable) (1925)
The Irreparable (LV. L'Irréparable) (1973)
The Irreparable (LV. L'Irréparable) (Can)
La Isla Del Naufrago (1964)
The Isle of Saturn (1951)
January Willow (1971)
Jungle Twilight (1932)
The Kingdom of Shadows (1922)
The Knoll (1962)
The Lake (Le Lac)
L'Ame du vin (CXXVIII. L’Ame du vin)
Lament for Vixeela (1996)
The Lament of Icarus (CIII. Les Plaintes d’un Icare)
Lament of the Stars (1912)
Lamia (24 Jan 1940)
L'Amour Supreme (1973)
The Land of Evil Stars (1922)
The Last Apricot (1958)
The Last Goddess (1971)
The Last Night (1912)
The Last Oblivion (7 Feb 1924)
Late November Evening (1971)
Late Pear-Pruner (1958)
Laus Mortis (Sep 1921)
Lawn-Mower (1976)
Lemurienne (20 Dec 1923)
L'Ennemi (X. L’Ennemi)
Lesbos (IV. Lesbos)
L'Espoir Du Néant (1971)
Lethe (From) (1971)
Lethe (I) (1912)
Lethe (II. Le Léthé) (1971)
L'Héautontimorouménos (CV. L’Héautontimorouménos)
L'Homme et la Mer (XIV. L’Homme et la Mer)
Lichens (1971)
The Limniad (1971)
L'Imprévu (LXXXVIII. L’Imprévu)
Lines on A Picture (1971)
L'Invitation au Voyage (LIV. L’Invitation au Voyage)
Litany to Satan (CXLV. Les Litanies de Satan)
A Live-Oak Leaf (6 Oct 1911)
Lo Ignoto (1964)
Lola de Valence (CX. Lola de Valence)
Los Poetas (1964)
Loss (1925)
Love And Death (1971)
Love and the Cranium (CXLII. L’Amour et le crâne)
Love in Dreams (1971)
Love Is Not Yours, Love Is Not Mine (1922)
Love Malevolent (1922)
The Love of Falsehood (CXXII. L’Amour du mensonge)
The Love-Potion (3 May 1923)
Luminary (Luminar)
Luna Aeternalis (1912)
Lunar Mystery (1915)
La Lune offensée (CXI. La Lune Offensée)
The Mad Wind (1912)
A Une Madone (LVIII. A une Madone)
A Madrigal (1976)
Madrigal (1971)
Madrigal of Evanescence (1971)
Madrigal of Memory (1971)
Madrigal of Sorrow (XC. Madrigal triste)
Malediction (1951)
La Mare (1971)
Les Marées (1971)
Une Martyre (CXXXV. Une Martyre)
Le Masque (XXI. Le Masque)
The Masque of Forsaken Gods (1912)
Maya (1925)
The Maze of Sleep (1912)
The Meaning (1912)
Medusa (17 May 1911)
The Medusa of Despair (20 Dec 1913)
The Medusa of the Skies (1912)
A Meeting (3 Jan 1924)
The Melancholy Pool (1922)
Memnon At Midnight (1918)
Memoria Roja (1964)
Memorial (1963)

A Une Mendiante rousse (CXII. A une Mendiante rousse)
The Messengers (21 May 1911)
The Metamorphoses of the Vampire (VI. Les Métamorphoses du Vampire) (1958)
Metaphor (7 Jun 1923)
Midnight Beach (5 Sep 1943)
The Mime of Sleep (1971)
Minatory (1925)
The Ministers of Law (1918)
Mirage (1922)
Le Miroir Des Blanches Fleurs (1971)
Mirrors (1922)
The Mirrors of Beauty (1922)
Mists and Rains (CXXV. Brumes et pluies) (19 Nov 1925)
Mithridates (1958)
Mœsta et errabunda (LXIV. Moesta et errabunda) (1925)
Moly (1950)
Moments (1971)
The Monacle (1958)
Moon-Dawn (Aug 1923)
Moonlight (Ambitious)
Moonlight (Claire de lune) (1971)
The Moonlight Desert
Morning on An Eastern Sea (1970)
The Morning Pool (1912)
Mors (24 Apr 1918)
La Mort des Amants (1971)
La Mort des artistes (CXLVIII. La Mort des artistes)
La Mort des pauvres (CXLVII. La Mort des pauvres)
Le Mort Joyeux
Le Mort Joyeux (LXXIV. Le Mort Joyeux)
The Motes (1922)
Mountain Trail (1971)
The Mummy (Jun 1919)
Mummy of the Flower (1971)
La Muse vénale (VIII. La Muse vénale) (1925)
Mushroom-Gatherers (1971)
La Musique (LXXI. La Musique) (1925)
[Myrtil and Palemone] (Myrtil et Palémone)
Mystery (1971)
Nada (1957)
The Nameless Wraith (1948)
Namelessness
Necromancy (Jan 1934)
Nemea (Némée)
The Nemesis of Suns (1912)
Neptune
The Nereid (12 Jan 1913)
Nero (1912)
Nevermore (1971)
The Nevermore-To-Be (1971)
Night (Noche)
Night (The) (1970)
Night (Twilight)
The Night Forest (1912)
Night of Miletus (1971)
Nightfall (1924)
Nightmare (1922)
Nightmare of the Lilliputian (1958)
The Nightmare Tarn (Nov 1929)
Nirvana (1912)
'No more the pine'
No Stranger Dream (1958)
Nocturnal Pines (1971)
Nocturne (Sep 1912)
Nocturne: Grant Avenue (1962)
The Noon of the Seasons (1970)
"Not Altogether Sleep" (1951)
Not Theirs the Cypress-Arch (1951)
November (1971)
November Twilight (1922)
Nuns Walking in the Orchard (1971)
Nyctalops (Oct 1929)
The Nymph (1971)
Golden-Tongued Romance (1951)
Oblivion (L’Oubli) (1951)
Obsession (LXXXI. Obsession) (1925)
October (May 1935)
Ode (O) (3 Dec 1925)
Ode (Your)
Ode on Imagination (1912)
Ode to Light (1974)
Ode to Matter (1970)
Ode to Music (1912)
Ode to Peace
Ode to the Abyss (3 May 1911)
Odysseus in Eternity (1971)
Old Hydraulic Diggings (1971)
Old Limestone Kiln (1971)
An Old theme (1971)
The Old Water-Wheel (1951)
Omniety (1944)
On a Broken Statue (Sur un Marbre brisé)
On A Chinese Vase (1971)
On Re-Reading Baudelaire (13 Dec 1923)
On "Tasso in Prison" by Eugène Delacroix (CI. Sur Le Tasse en Prison d’Eugène Delacroix)
On the Canyon-Side (27 Sep 1923)
On the Mount of Stone (1971)
One Evening (1971)
Only to One Returned (1958)
The Orchid of Beauty (1922)
Ougabalys (15 Sep 1929)
The Outer Land (26 May 1935)
Outlanders (Jul 1937)
The Owls (LXIX. Les Hiboux) (1 Oct 1925)
Paean (1962)
The Pagan (1958)
A Pagan's Prayer (LXXXVI. La Prière d’un païen)
The Pageant of Music (1970)
The Palace of Jewels (1970)
Palms (Apr 1920)
Paphnutius (1958)
A Parisian Dream (CXXVI. Rêve parisien) (1925)
Parnassus À La Mode (1958)
Passing of An Elder God (1958)
Pastel (Pastel)
Paysage (CVIII. Paysage)
Un Paysage Paîen (1971)
Perseus And Medusa (1958)
Les Petites Vieilles (CXV. Les Petites Vieilles)
Phallus Impudica (1971)
A Phantasy of Twilight (1975)
The Phantom (LXV. Le Revenant) (1971)
Philtre (1958)
The Phoenix (1958)
Picture by Piero Di Cosimo (1971)
Pine Needles (1912)
La Pipe (LXX. La Pipe)
Plague from the Abatoir [sic] (1971)
Plaisir d'Amour (Plaisir d’Amour)
Plum-Flowers (Mar 1924)
Poet in A Barroom (1971)
The Poet Talks with the Biographers (1951)
Poets in Hades (1971)
The Poison (L. Le Poison) (1971)
Pool At Lobos (1971)
Poplars (1973)
The Possessed (XXXVIII. Le Possédé)
Postlude (1962)
The Potion of Dreams (1975)
Pour Chercher Du Nouveau (1949)
The Power of Eld (1970)
A Prayer (1971)
A Precept (1922)
Preface (Preface)
The Price (1912)
Prisoner in Vain (1971)
De Profundis clamavi (XXXI. De profundis clamavi) (1971)
The Prophet Speaks (Sep 1938)
Psalm (1922)
Psalm (From - Ebony And Crystal)
A Psalm to the Best Beloved (1922)
Psalm to the Desert (1915)
The Pursuer (Nov 1957)
Query (1925)
Quest (1922)
Quiddity (1958)
La Rançon (XCVIII. La Rançon)
The Rebel (XCV. Le Rebelle)
Reclamation (1973)
Recompense (1922)
Refuge (1971)
The Refuge of Beauty (1918)
Reigning Empress (1971)
Remember Thee
Remembered Light (Dec 1912)
Remembrance (17 Jan 1924)
The Remorse of the Dead (XXXIV. Remords Posthume) (Apr 1925)
Requiescat (1922)
Requiescat in Pace (M.L.M.) (May 1920)
Resurrection (Jul 1947)
The Retribution (1912)
Retrospect And Forecast (1912)
The Return of Hyperion (1912)
La Rêve d'un curieux (CL. Le Rêve d’un curieux)
Rêve Parisian
Revenant (Jul 1933)
Reverie in August (1962)
Réversibilité (XLV. Réversibilité)
Rhythm (Ritmo)
Ripe Mulberries
The River of Life
River-Canyon (1971)
Rosa Mystica (1922)
Rubaiyat of Saiyed
Rustic Life (Vida aldeana)
Said the Dreamer (1958)
The Samurai (Le Samouraï)
Sandalwood (1937)
Satan Unrepentant (Oct 1912)
Satiety (A) (1971)
Satiety (Dear) (1922)
Saturn (1912)
Saturnian Cinema (1976)
The Saturnienne (Dec 1925)
School-Room Pastime (1971)
The Sciapod (1958)
Sea Cycle (1962)
The Sea-Gods (21 Jun 1923)
Sea-Memory (1971)
The Secret (19 Apr 1923)
Secret Love (1958)
Sed non Satiata (XXVII. Sed non Satiata) (1949)
Sed non Satiata (XXVII. Sed non Satiata) (O)
Seeker (1951)
Seer of the Cycles (1976)
Selenique (26 Jul 1923)
Semblance (12 Apr 1923)
Semper Eadem (XLI. Semper Eadem) (1925)
Les Sept Vieillards (CXIV. Les Sept Vieillards)
September (11 Sep 1929)
Sepulture (Oct 1918)
Sépulture (LXXII. Sépulture)
Le Serpent qui danse (XXIX. Le Serpent qui Danse)
Sestet (1971)
A Setting Sun (Soleil couchant)
Shadow of Nightmare (1912)
The Shadow of the Unattained
Shadows (12 Sep 1929)
Ye Shall Return (1951)
Shapes in the Sunset (1951)
The Sick Muse (VII. La Muse Malade) (1925)
A Sierran Sunrise (1970)
The Sierras (Sep 1910)
Siesta (Sieste)
Silent Hour (1962)
Sinbad, It Was Not Well to Brag (1951)
Sisina (LX. Sisina)
Slaughter-House in Spring
Slaughter-House Pasture (1971)
The Sleep of the Cayman (El sueño del caimán)
The Sleep of the Condor (1971)
The Sleep of the Condor (Le Sommeil du condor)
Snake, Owl, Cat or Hawk (1971)
The Snow-Blossoms (1912)
Snowfall on Acacia (1971)
Soliloquy in An Ebon tower (1951)
Solution (1922)
Solvet Seclum (Solvet seclum)
Some Blind Eidolon (23 Mar 1942)
Someone (1971)
Somnus (1971)
Song ([Chanson])
Song (I) (1922)
Song (Rappelle-toi)
Song (Vagrant) (31 May 1923)
Song At Evenfall (1930)
A Song from Hell (1975)
Song from Les Uns et Les Autres ([Song from] Les Uns et les autres)
Song of Autumn (LVII. Chant d’automne) (1958)
The Song of Aviol (5 Apr 1923)
The Song of Cartha (3 May 1923)
The Song of A Comet (1912)
A Song of Dreams (1912)
Song of Sappho's Arabian Daughter (Feb 1919)
The Song of Songs (El Cantar de los Cantares)
Song of the Necromancer (1937)
The Song of the Stars (1912)
The Song of the Worlds (1975)
Song to Oblivion (1912)
Sonnet (Bois sacré)
Sonnet (Empress) (1962)
Sonnet (Green) (1962)
Sonnet (How) (1971)
Sonnet d'automne (LXVI. Sonnet d’automne)
Sonnet for the Psychoanalysts (1951)
The Sorcerer to His Love (16 Nov 1941)
The Sorrow of the Winds (Dec 1912)
The Soul of the Sea (1912)
Souvenance (1976)
The Sower (Rimas LX)
The Sparrow's Nest (1958)
Spectral Life (1971)
Sphinx And Medusa (1975)
The Sphinx of the infinite (1973)
The Spiritual Dawn (XLVII. L’Aube Spirituelle) (1925)
Spleen (LXXIX. Spleen)
Spleen (LXXVII. Spleen)
Spleen (LXXVIII. Spleen)
Spleen (LXXX. Spleen) (Feb 1926)
Spleen (Spleen)
Spring Nunnery (1971)
The Stained Window (Vitrail)
The Star-Treader (Oct 1911)
Storm's End (1971)
Stormy Afterglow (1971)
Strange Girl (1971)
Strangeness (3 Oct 1916)
The Stylite (1951)
Sufficiency (1971)
Suggestion (1973)
The Summer Moon (1912)
The Sun (CIX. Le Soleil)
The Suns And the Void (1974)
A Sunset (As) (1912)
A Sunset (Far)
Sunset Over Farm-Land (1971)
Supplication (1962)
Surrealist Sonnet (1951)
Symbols (1922)
Sympathetic Horror (LXXXIII. Horreur sympathique) (1925)
The Tartarus of the Suns (1970)
The Tears of Lilith (26 Apr 1917)
Temporality (13 Apr 1928)
The Temptation
Tempus (1971)
"That Last infirmity" (1971)
"That Motley Drama" (1958)
Thebaid (1958)
The Thralls of Circe Climb Parnassus (1971)
The Throne of Winter (1976)
Tin Can on the Mountain-Top (1971)
Tired Gardener (1958)
The Titans in Tartarus (1974)
The Titans Triumphant
To a Creole Lady (LXIII. A une Dame créole)
To a Malabaress (XCII. A une Malabaraise)
To a Northern Venus
To a Passer-by (CXVII. A une Passante)
To a Woman (A une femme)
To Antares (25 Aug 1927)
To Beauty (1971)
To George Sterling (Deep) (1970)
To George Sterling (High) (1910)
To George Sterling (His) (1970)
To George Sterling (What) (1970)
To George Sterling: A Valediction (Dec 1926)
To Her Who Is Too Gay (III. A celle qui est trop gaie)
To Howard Phillips Lovecraft (31 Mar 1937)
To A Mariposa Lily (1976)
To Nora May French (I) (Jul 1920)
To Nora May French (II) (1971)
To Omar Khayyam (13 Dec 1919)
To One Absent (1962)
To the Beloved (1922)
To the Chimera (1922)
To the Daemon of Sublimity (1963)
To the Darkness (1912)
To the Morning Star (1976)
To the Nightshade (1970)
To the Sun (1912)
To Theodore de Banville (XVI. A Théodore de Banville)
To Whom It May Concern (1971)
The Toiling Skeleton (CXVIII. Le Squelette laboureur)
Tolometh (1958)
Touch (1971)
Tout entière (XLII. Tout Entière)
Town Lights (1971)
Transcendence (1922)
Transmutation (31 Jan 1924)
Travelling Gypsies (XIII. Bohémiens en Voyage)
Triple Aspect (1922)
Tristan to Iseult (1971)
Tristesses de la lune (LXVII. Tristesses de la lune)
Trope (1971)
Tryst At Lobos (1971)
Twilight (Crépuscule)
The Twilight of the Gods (1951)
Twilight on the Snow (1922)
Twilight Song (1962)
The Twilight Woods (1976)
The Two Kind Sisters (CXXXVII. Les Deux Bonnes Soeurs) (1971)
Two Myths And A Fable (1951)
The Unfinished Quest (1977)
Unicorn (1958)
Union (1922)
The Unmerciful Mistress (1977)
The Unremembered (1912)
[Untitled] (Love)
Untold Arabian Fable (1958)
Uriel
A Valediction (9 Aug 1923)
The Vampire (XXXII. Le Vampire)
Vaticinations (1971)
Venus (1971)
Vers pour le portrait d'Honoré Daumier (LXI. Vers pour le portrait d’Honoré Daumier)
Very Far from Here (XCIX. Bien loin d’ici)
Une Vie Spectrale (1971)
A Vision of Lucifer (1922)
The Voice (XCIII. La Voix) (1971)
The Voice in the Pines
The Voice of Silence (1970)
The Voyage (CLI. Le Voyage)
Un Voyage à Cythère (CXLI. Un Voyage à Cythère)
Un Voyage à Cythère (CXLI. Un Voyage à Cythère) (My)
Vultures Come to the Ambarvalia (1971)
The Waning Moon (1976)
Warning (3 Mar 1928)
Water-Fight (1971)
Water-Hemlock (1971)
We Shall Meet (I) (26 Apr 1923)
We Shall Meet (II)
Weavings (1970)
What One Hears on the Mountain (Ce qu’on entend sur la montagne)
The Wheel of Omphale (Le Rouet d’Omphale) (1971)
Where? (Rimas XXXVIII) (1958)
The Whisper of the Worm (1971)
White Death (1912)
Willow-Cutting in Autumn (1958)
The Wind And the Moon (1912)
Wind-Ripples (6 Oct 1911)
The Wind-Threnody (1977)
Windows At Lamplighting Time (1971)
The Winds (1912)
The Wine of Lovers (CXXXII. Le Vin des Amants) (1925)
Wine of Summer (1971)
The Wine of the Assassin (CXXX. Le Vin de l’assassin)
The Wine of the Rag-Pickers (CXXIX. Le Vin de chiffonniers)
The Wine of the Solitary (CXXXI. Le Vin du solitaire)
The Wingless Archangels (28 Jun 1923)
Wings of Perfume (1976)
Winter Midnight (II) (1976)
Winter Moonlight (I) (1922)
Winter Moonlight (The) (1922)
Witch Dance (1941)
The Witch in the Graveyard (1922)
The Witch with Eyes of Amber (1923)
Wizard's Love (1962)
Wizard's Love (Latter manuscript version)
A Woman at Prayer (Celle qui prie)
The World
The World Rolls On (Rimas I (Libro de los gorriones))
The Years Restored (1975)
Yerba Buena (1962)
You Are Not Beautiful (20 Dec 1923)
Zothique (1951)
Zuleika: An Oriental Song
(CXXIII)
(CXXIV)
(V)
(XL)
(XLIII)
(XXV)
(XXVI)
(XXVIII)
(XXXIII)

See also

 As It Is Written – a novel mistakenly republished under Smith's name

References

 
Bibliographies by writer
Bibliographies of American writers
Poetry bibliographies